Games of Pixar Pier is a collection of four boardwalk games themed to several different Pixar characters. It is located in Pixar Pier at Disney California Adventure.

History

Paradise Pier
Games of the Boardwalk officially opened in 2001 with the rest of Disney California Adventure. Originally, the games included Boardwalk Bowl, Dolphin Derby, San Joaquin Volley, Shore Shot, Angels in the Outfield, New Haul Fishery, and Cowhuenga Pass. 

In 2008, with construction beginning on Toy Story Midway Mania!, many of the original were either closed or re-themed. This renovation was part of the $1.1 billion expansion project for Disney California Adventure. The new games opened on April 7, 2009 and included Goofy About Fishin', Casey at the Bat, Bullseye Stallion Stampede, and Dumbo Bucket Brigade.

Pixar Pier
The Games of the Boardwalk closed on January 8, 2018 during the re-theming of Paradise Pier to Pixar Pier. During this transformation, the Games of the Boardwalk were renamed Games of Pixar Pier. They opened with Pixar Pier on June 23, 2018.

Bullseye Stallion Stampede remained. The other three games were turned into La Luna Star Catcher, WALL-E Space Race, and Heimlich's Candy Corn Toss.

References

External links

Operating amusement attractions
Disney California Adventure
Paradise Pier
Pixar Pier
Amusement rides introduced in 2001
Amusement rides that closed in 2018
Amusement rides introduced in 2018
2001 establishments in California
2018 disestablishments in California